Mark Lee may refer to:

Arts and entertainment

Film and television
Mark Lee (Australian actor) (born 1958), Australian actor and director
Mark Lee (Singaporean actor) (born 1968), Singaporean actor, comedian and director
Mark Lee (Taiwanese actor) or Lee Tien-chu (born 1956), Taiwanese actor
Mark Lee Ping-bing (born 1954), Taiwanese cinematographer

Other arts and entertainment
Mark Lee (singer) (born 1999), Canadian rapper and singer
Mark David Lee (born 1973), American musician and guitarist
Mark W. Lee, American novelist, playwright and journalist

Sports
Mark Lee (American football) (born 1958), former NFL player
Mark Lee (Australian rules footballer) (born 1959), Australian rules footballer
Mark Lee (left-handed pitcher) (born 1964), American baseball pitcher (1988–1995)
Mark Lee (right-handed pitcher) (born 1953), American baseball pitcher (1978–1981)
Mark Lee (footballer, born 1979), English footballer player
Mark Lee (ice hockey) (born 1984), Canadian ice hockey player
Mark Lee (rugby league) (born 1968), rugby league footballer
Mark Lee (sportscaster), Canadian sportscaster

Other people
Mark Lee (architect), Chinese-American architect
Mark C. Lee (born 1952), American astronaut
Mark Owen Lee or M. Owen Lee (1930–2019), American classics and music scholar and Roman Catholic priest

See also
Marc Lee (born 1969), Swiss new media artist
Marc Alan Lee (1978–2006), United States Navy SEAL